The Reese's College All-Star Game, founded by the NABC, is a men's college basketball game showcasing 20 of the best senior players in NCAA Division I. The two teams are coached by current and/or former college basketball coaches. The game is played annually on the Friday of Final Four weekend during the men's basketball tournament. The all-star game is also played in the same basketball center as the semifinal and final games of the tournament.

Reese's also sponsors the senior all-star games for NCAA Division II and Division III, held at their respective NCAA Championships.

Game results

2013 Reese’s College All-Star Game

The 2013 Reese's College All-Star Game was held on April 5, 2013, in Georgia Dome, Atlanta, GA between East and West.

Ohio University's D.J. Cooper was named the Reese's Perfect Player of the Game from the East team, leading the East to an 87–81 win over the West in the 2013 Reese's Division I College All-Star Game at the Georgia Dome. Cooper was one of six players on the East team to finish in double figures as he scored 11 points to go with four rebounds while finishing with a game-high nine assists.

Iowa State's Will Clyburn was named the Reese's Perfect Player of the Game for the West as he finished with a game-high 17 points to go with eight rebounds.

The East led 43–33 at intermission as Brandon Davies of BYU led the way for the East in the first half with eight points and six rebounds.

Clyburn had seven first-half points to lead the West while Mouphtaou Yarou from Villanova had a team-high six rebounds in the opening half.

The East took its largest lead of the game 60–45 with 13:45 left. The West then got back in the game by scoring eight straight to begin a 17–4 spurt cutting the deficit to just two at 64–62 following a basket by Bucknell's Mike Muscala with 7:42 left in the game.

The East led 68–66 with 5:04 left and put the game away with a 9–0 run keyed by a pair of baskets by Long Beach State's James Ennis to take a 77–66 lead with 2:11 remaining.

VCU's Troy Daniels knocked down a three-pointer with 25.6 seconds left pulling the West to within 83–79, but that was as close as they would get.

Ennis led the East with 13 points while E.J. Singler (Oregon) and Davies had 12 points each for the East, coached by Tennessee head coach Cuonzo Martin. Also for the East, Rodney McGruder (Kansas State) finished with 11 points while Jake Cohen (Davidson) added ten points in the win. Singler and Davies had nine rebounds each to lead the East.

Muscala added 15 points and eight rebounds while Jack Cooley (Notre Dame) finished with a double-double with 13 points and a game-high tying 10 rebounds for the West team, coached by Iowa State head coach Fred Hoiberg. Yarou also had a game-high 10 rebounds for the West.

References

Basketball all-star games

Recurring sporting events established in 1963